Forest Home is an unincorporated community in Butler County, Alabama.  It has a post office with the 36030 ZIP code.

Geography

Notable person
Dixie Parker, baseball player

References

Unincorporated communities in Alabama
Unincorporated communities in Butler County, Alabama